New Asia College is a constituent college of the Chinese University of Hong Kong located in Sha Tin, New Territories, Hong Kong.

History 
New Asia College was founded in 1949 by Chinese scholars Ch'ien Mu (Qian Mu), Tang Junyi (Tang Chun-i), and Zhang Pijie (Tchang Pi-kai), in Hong Kong, then a British dependency, after the Communist victory in mainland China.

In 1963, the College joined forces with United College and Chung Chi College to form the Chinese University of Hong Kong under a charter granted by the Legislative Council of Hong Kong. The College has since then become a research and educational hub for Confucian philosophy and Chinese studies.

Presidents and Heads

Presidents & Heads of New Asia College:

Presidents (1949-1977)
1. Prof. Ch'ien Mu (1949-1965)
2. Prof. Ou Tsuin-chen (吳俊升) (1965-1969)
3. Prof. Y.T. Shen (1969-1970)
4. Prof. Y.P. Mei  (1970-1973)
5. Prof. Yu Ying-shih (1973-1975)
6. Prof. Chuan Han-sheng (1975-1977)

College Heads (1977-Present)
7. Prof. Ambrose King (1977-1985)
8. Prof. Lin Tzong-biau (1985-1992)
9. Prof. Leung Ping-chung (1992-2002)
10. Prof. Henry N.C. Wong (2002-2010)
11. Prof. Shun Kwong-loi (2010-2013)
12. Prof. Henry N.C. Wong (2014-2020)
13. Prof. Hector Sun-on Chan (2021-Present)

Notable alumni
 Vincent Cheng (1973) — chairman of HSBC China (2005–11); chairman of The Hongkong and Shanghai Banking Corporation (2005–10)
 Lavender Cheung (1993) — news anchor at Cable TV Hong Kong (1998–2009)
 Man-kwong Cheung (1978) — member of the Legislative Council from the Education constituency (1991–97, 1998-2012); president of the Hong Kong Professional Teachers' Union (1990–2010)
 Ming-kwai Lee (1972) — Commissioner of Police (2003–07)
 Sammy Leung (1994) — DJ, MC, and actor 
 Lap-Chee Tsui (1972) — geneticist; vice-chancellor and president of the University of Hong Kong (2002–14)
 Ying-shih Yu (1952) — historian; tenured professor at Harvard University, Yale University, and Princeton University

See also
New Asia Middle School
Chinese University of Hong Kong

References

External links

  List of faculty of New Asia College (1949-1976)

 
Chinese University of Hong Kong